Thermozephyrus ataxus, the wonderful hairstreak, is a small butterfly found from India to Japan that belongs to the lycaenids or blues family.

Taxonomy
The butterfly was previously classified as Thecla ataxus Doubleday. It is also presently classified as Chrysozephyrus ataxus.

Range
The species occurs in Murree (Pakistan), and in India from Jammu and Kashmir to Kumaon and in the Naga Hills. In general, the range extends from the western Himalayas to China and Japan.

Subspecies
Thermozephyrus ataxus ataxus (north-western India to Upper Burma)
Thermozephyrus ataxus kirishimaensis (Okajima, 1922) (Japan)
Thermozephyrus ataxus lingi (Okano & Okura, 1969) (Taiwan)
Thermozephyrus ataxus motohiroi (Fujioka, 2001)
Thermozephyrus ataxus yakushimaensis (Yazaki, 1924) (Japan)
Thermozephyrus ataxus tsukiyamai (Fujioka, 2001) (Myanmar)
Thermozephyrus ataxus zulla (Tytler, 1915) (Assam, western China)

Cited references

See also
Lycaenidae
List of butterflies of India (Lycaenidae)

References
  
 
 
 
 

Theclini
Monotypic butterfly genera
Lycaenidae genera